Fouad Siniora (born 19 July 1943) is a Lebanese politician, a former Prime Minister of Lebanon, a position he held from 19 July 2005 to 25 May 2008. He stepped down on 9 November 2009 in favor of Saad Hariri, the late Rafik Hariri's son. He is the leader of the parliamentary group of the Future Movement.

Early career
In the 1970s, Sanioura worked for Citibank and taught at the American University of Beirut, his alma mater, and at the Lebanese University.

Member of National Assembly
He served as minister of state for financial affairs from 1992 to 1998, and as minister of finance from 2000 to 2004.

Prime minister
After the victory of the anti-Syrian opposition in parliamentary elections held in May and June 2005, Fuad Siniora was asked by President Lahoud on 30 June 2005 to form a government. He resigned from the chairmanship of Group Méditerranée (a banking holding controlled by the Hariri family). After laborious negotiations with the President and the different political forces, Siniora formed a government on 19 July 2005.

2006 Lebanon War
On 12 July 2006, Hezbollah launched a deadly cross-border attack against Israel Israel started a 33-day heavy bombardment and land invasion of Lebanon, also known as the 2006 Lebanon War. On 27 July 2006, Siniora, seeking to end the conflict, presented a seven-point Siniora Plan at a 15-nation conference in Rome. Siniora also called for an Arab League meeting in Beirut. During a televised address at the conference, he famously "sobbed" as he described the effects of the war on the Lebanese people.

Events leading to the Doha Agreement
On 13 November 2006, Shiite ministers backed by Hezbollah and Amal resigned from Siniora's cabinet. This took place on the eve of the day when the Special Tribunal for Lebanon trying the murderers of Rafik Hariri was to be discussed in a cabinet meeting. Although there were only six resigning ministers, nearly 40% of the Lebanese MPs are in the opposition.

The Lebanese opposition claimed that this resignation meant that the Siniora Government was not a legitimate one because it did not represent all religious groups in Lebanon, namely the Shiite Lebanese. According to the constitution, the government is legal as long as it has two-thirds of the ministers, and so the majority believed the Siniora government was still a totally legal cabinet.

On 1 December 2006, the parliamentary minority, primarily the pro-Syrian parties of Amal, Hezbollah and the Free Patriotic Movement of Michael Aoun launched a campaign of street demonstrations with the goal of getting veto power in the government. The country was further put into paralysis when the opposition refused to attend the parliament and vote for a new president, after Emile Lahoud's presidential term expired. This meant the Fuad Siniora was an acting president until the new president was voted in.

On 7 May 2008, Hizbollah, Amal and the Syrian Social Nationalist Party, among others, launched an armed strike against Beirut. The Beirut–Rafic Hariri International Airport, the Government's Grand Serail, and houses of Majority leaders, Saad Hariri and Walid Jumblatt, were all put under siege. Mount Lebanon was also attacked in the operation. Vengeance attacks broke out in other areas of Lebanon.

Personal life
Siniora is known for his interest in Arab literature and poetry.

See also
 First Cabinet of Fouad Siniora
 Position of Lebanon in the 2006 Lebanon War
 Siniora Plan

Notes

References

External links
 Official Website: Fuad Siniora
 Profile: Fuad Siniora BBC News, 28 May 2008
 Siniora reappointed as Lebanon PM BBC News, 28 May 2008
 Siniora, Fuad End This Tragedy Now: Israel Must Be Made to Respect International Law Washington Post, 9 August 2006

|-

1943 births
American University of Beirut alumni
Finance ministers of Lebanon
Future Movement politicians
Living people
Members of the Parliament of Lebanon
People from Sidon
Prime Ministers of Lebanon
20th-century Lebanese politicians
21st-century Lebanese politicians